Camargo is a home rule-class city in Montgomery County, Kentucky, in the United States. The population was 1,081 at the 2010 census. It is part of the Mount Sterling Micropolitan Statistical Area.

The town was named by soldiers returning from the Mexican–American War, either in honor of Camargo in Mexico or a Mexican entertainer of that name. The post office was established in 1848 and closed in 1963.

Geography
Camargo is located at  (37.999241, -83.896203).

Demographics

As of the census of 2000, there were 923 people, 362 households, and 275 families residing in the city. The racial makeup of the city was 98.70% White, 0.11% Asian, and 1.19% from two or more races. Hispanic or Latino of any race were 0.54% of the population.

There were 362 households, out of which 33.1% had children under the age of 18 living with them, 62.2% were married couples living together, 11.3% had a female householder with no husband present, and 23.8% were non-families. 20.7% of all households were made up of individuals, and 8.3% had someone living alone who was 65 years of age or older. The average household size was 2.55 and the average family size was 2.93.

In the city, the population was spread out, with 24.6% under the age of 18, 10.3% from 18 to 24, 30.8% from 25 to 44, 22.6% from 45 to 64, and 11.7% who were 65 years of age or older. The median age was 35 years. For every 100 females, there were 96.4 males. For every 100 females age 18 and over, there were 90.7 males.

The median income for a household in the city was $27,009, and the median income for a family was $32,019. Males had a median income of $31,827 versus $19,018 for females. The per capita income for the city was $13,154. About 23.6% of families and 27.0% of the population were below the poverty line, including 34.1% of those under age 18 and 31.5% of those age 65 or over.

Education
Camargo has a lending library, a branch of the Montgomery County Public Library.

References

 

Cities in Kentucky
Cities in Montgomery County, Kentucky
Mount Sterling, Kentucky micropolitan area
Populated places established in 1969